Desire is a Canada/Germany treaty coproduction drama film, released in 2000. It was directed and written by Colleen Murphy produced by Elizabeth Yake (Canada) and Eberhard Junkersdorf (Germany). The film premiered at the Toronto International Film Festival.

Plot
The film stars Zachary Bennett as Francis Waterson, an aspiring concert pianist, and Katja Riemann as Halley Fischer, an elementary school teacher with whom Francis enters a romantic relationship.

Awards and nominations

The film garnered two Genie Award nominations at the 22nd Genie Awards, with a Best Actress nod for Katja Riemann and a Best Actor nomination for Zachary Bennett.

External links
 

2000 films
Canadian drama films
English-language Canadian films
English-language German films
German drama films
2000s English-language films
2000s Canadian films
2000s German films